Code page 1020 (CCSID 1020), also known as CP1020, is an IBM code page number assigned to the French-Canadian variant of DEC's National Replacement Character Set (NRCS). The 7-bit character set was introduced for DEC's computer terminal systems, starting with the VT200 series in 1983, but is also used by IBM for their DEC emulation. Similar but not identical to the series of ISO 646 character sets, the character set is a close derivation from ASCII with only ten code points differing.

Code page layout

See also
Code page 1104 (French NRCS)
National Replacement Character Set (NRCS)

References

1020